Manery is a surname. Notable people with the surname include:

Kris Manery (born 1954), Canadian ice hockey player
Randy Manery (born 1949), Canadian ice hockey player and nonprofit leader

See also

Mantella manery, a species of frog
Maneri